Fort George was a railway station at Ardersier, Highland, to the west of Nairn, Scotland, (now in the Highland Council Area).

References

Disused railway stations in Highland (council area)
Railway stations in Great Britain opened in 1899
Railway stations in Great Britain closed in 1943
Former Highland Railway stations